The slender-billed miner (Geositta tenuirostris) is a species of bird in the family Furnariidae. It is found in Argentina, Bolivia, Chile, Ecuador, and Peru. Its natural habitats are subtropical or tropical high-altitude grassland and pastureland.

References

slender-billed miner
Birds of the Puna grassland
slender-billed miner
Taxonomy articles created by Polbot
Taxa named by Frédéric de Lafresnaye